Mount Nelson is a prominent  mountain summit located in the Purcell Mountains of southeast British Columbia, Canada. Sitting atop the peak is a 5 foot tall aluminum cross that marks the summit and acts as a storage unit for the summit register. It was built and erected in 1986 by the Kloos family out of Invermere, BC.

History

The mountain was named in 1807 by David Thompson after Lord Admiral Nelson (1758-1805) to commemorate the Battle of Trafalgar. The mountain's name was officially adopted March 31, 1924, by the Geographical Names Board of Canada. The first ascent of the peak was made in September 1910 by C. D. Ellis via the south ridge.

Climate

Based on the Köppen climate classification, Mount Nelson is located in a subarctic climate zone with cold, snowy winters, and mild summers.

Climbing Routes

Established climbing routes on Mt. Nelson:

 South Ridge - First ascent 1910
 Southwest Ridge - FA 1911
 Southwest Face - FA 1913
 East Ridge - FA 1975

See also

 Geography of British Columbia
 Geology of British Columbia

Notes

Gallery

External links
 Weather: Mount Nelson

Nelson
Nelson
Nelson
Kootenay Land District